John Kevin Hagy (born December 9, 1965) is a former professional American football player who spent three seasons in the National Football League with the Buffalo Bills from 1988 to 1990. Hagy appeared in a total of 28 career games, including 11 starts. Nicknamed "The Hitman", he played college football at Texas.

References

Living people
1965 births
Buffalo Bills players
American football defensive backs
Texas Longhorns football players
Players of American football from Texas